Johan Erik Hedberg (9 March 1767 – 9 August 1823) was a Finnish painter.

Hedberg was born in Stockholm, and studied at the Royal Swedish Academy of Arts. He was married and had one son. Hedberg worked as a drawing teacher at the Royal Academy of Turku from 1799 until his death in 1823.

References
 Johan Erik Hedberg. University of Helsinki. (In Finnish.)
 Art Collections. University of Helsinki. (In Finnish.)

18th-century Finnish painters
18th-century male artists
Finnish male painters
19th-century Finnish painters
1767 births
1823 deaths
Artists from Stockholm
19th-century Finnish male artists